Broward College is a public college in Fort Lauderdale, Florida.  It is part of the Florida College System. It was established in 1959 as part of a move to broaden Florida's two-year colleges. In 2008 it adopted its current name, reflecting that it is one of the schools designated a "state college", meaning it can offer four-year bachelor's degrees.

History

The institution was founded in 1959 as the Junior College of Broward County (JCBC). It opened its doors the following year under the leadership of President Joe B. Rushing, with a faculty of 28 serving a class of 701 students. Until the college's first permanent buildings were completed in 1963, students attended classes in the former Naval Air Station Junior High buildings on the western edge of the Fort Lauderdale-Hollywood International Airport.

After helping JCBC through its formative years and onto firm footing, Rushing in 1965 announced he was returning to his home state of Texas to become founding president of Tarrant County Community College in Fort Worth. He was followed by Dr. Myron Blee, and then in 1968, A. Hugh Adams, superintendent of public education in Charlotte County, Florida, was appointed president and served in that role until 1986.

Changes began almost immediately. A month after his arrival, the college changed its name to Broward Junior College. Two months after Dr. Adams’ arrival, the Florida Legislature removed junior colleges from oversight by county school boards, and transformed their advisory boards into district boards of trustees. In 1970, the college was renamed again to Broward Community College.

Adams’ interests lay in expanding access to the college for citizens living throughout the county. In his 19 years as president, South and North campuses were created, as was the Downtown Center and the Tigertail Lake Center.

Succeeding Adams was Dr. Will Holcombe, a protégée of Dr. James L. Wattenbarger, the architect of Florida's community college system and executive vice-president at Brevard Community College. Dr. Holcombe had served in a variety of administrative capacities at Broward before joining Brevard’s administrative team.

Dr. Larry Calderon succeeded Holcombe upon his retirement in 2004. Dr. Calderon, an expert in strategic planning, was serving as president of Ventura College when he was appointed Broward's fifth president, and its first of Hispanic heritage. When Dr. Calderon left the college in 2006, Holcombe returned to serve as interim president through the appointment of J. David Armstrong, Jr., in July 2007.  President Armstrong came to the college from his position as Chancellor of the Florida College System. In December 2017, Armstrong announced that he would transition from the role of president. Following a nationwide search Gregory Adam Haile, Esq. who served as General Counsel for the college was named president in May 2018. He officially assumed duties on July 1, 2018.

Campuses and education centers

Broward College has three campuses, which are connected to additional partnership centers, or branches, throughout Broward County:

The A. Hugh Adams Central Campus, the college's first permanent campus, is in Davie. Originally opened with seven buildings on a  site, the Adams campus is now home to the Buehler Planetarium and Observatory; Institute of Public Safety, a gold LEED-certified facility for the training of new and veteran law enforcement officers; the Mayer Gymnasium; a health sciences complex that includes a simulation center. The campus also features the Ralph R. Bailey Concert Hall and a visual and performing arts facility. The facility also houses the Rosemary Duffy Larson Gallery. Nearby is the Fine Arts Theatre, a 175-seat venue reserved exclusively for student theatrical productions. The University College Library there is a joint research facility owned by the college in partnership with Florida Atlantic University. The Adams Campus also is home to the College Academy @ BC a collegiate high school opened in partnership with the Broward County Public Schools in 2001.
The Judson A. Samuels South Campus, named for a South Broward community leader and one of the college's most influential trustees, is on a  tract in Pembroke Pines, just west of the Florida's Turnpike. The campus is home to the college's Aviation Institute, located adjacent to North Perry Airport, as well as the joint-use Broward College/Broward County South Regional Library. Dedicated on Feb. 1, 2007, the library is the first building in Broward County constructed to meet the standards of the Leadership in Energy and Environmental Design's (LEED) building rating system, set by the U.S. Green Building Council. Samuels South Campus has three partnership branches, including Pines Center, Miramar Town Center, and Miramar West Center.
The North Campus in Coconut Creek covers approximately  adjacent to the Florida Turnpike. Dedicated in 1972, North Campus has grown to more than a dozen buildings including the Omni Auditorium, Health Science Center II, the Toski-Battersby Golf Training Center and the Broward College/North Regional Broward County Library. It houses the Junior Achievement Huizenga Enterprise Village, named after Broward County entrepreneur and philanthropist Wayne Huizenga. North Campus also houses the college's manufacturing program and the Citrix IT Academy, part of the Citrix Academic Network.
The Willis Holcombe Center is located in the heart of Downtown Fort Lauderdale. Built in partnership with Florida Atlantic University, the Holcombe Center forms the Higher Education Complex on East Las Olas Boulevard.
The Institute for Economic Development is located within the Willis Holcombe Downtown Center (Fort Lauderdale). The institute offers a variety of continuing education courses, corporate training services, customized workforce development resources as well as support groups and training for women transitioning into the workforce.
The Pines Center serves southwestern Broward County as part of the Pembroke Pines Academic Village, a  campus built in the Jeffersonian quadrangle style of the University of Virginia. Other entities in the academic village include the Southwest Broward Regional Library, Pembroke Pines Charter High School, an athletic/aquatic complex and a wetlands preserve.
The Weston Center is located within the Weston Branch Library (Weston) and offers a variety of credit and non-credit courses. The site is home to a fast-track Associate in Arts degree in Business Administration.
Broward College Maroone Automotive Training Center at Miramar was opened early in 2007 on a  site on Riviera Boulevard adjacent to the Florida Turnpike near the Broward/Miami-Dade county line in Miramar. The center provides classrooms, work bays and administrative offices for the college's automotive programs. The center is also home to the Marine Center of Excellence, one of the nation's marine management programs. Broward's program is one of the 5 founding members of the American Boat and Yacht Council's Marine League. The league, composed of postsecondary technical and marine schools, is affiliated with the ABYC through their use of a common standards and systems-based curriculum.
The Tigertail Lake Center, located alongside I-95 in Dania Beach, offers conference and picnic facilities and aquatic and water sports classes. Scuba diving classes are also available.  The center also is home to the BC Adventure Learning Center, providing low and high-ropes challenge programs and other team-building exercises.
Broward College also has four International Centers located outside the United States, each of them offering standard, face-to-face Broward College courses identical to those taught in Florida, all the way up to complete associate degree programs:
 The Ecuador International Center, opened in 2007, is hosted by the Broward Center for American Education, with locations in Guayaquil and Quito, Ecuador.
 The Peru International Center, opened in 2009, is hosted by Universidad de San Ignacio Loyola (USIL).  USIL is a multi-campus modern urban institution in Lima, Peru.  It currently serves over 7,000 students from kindergarten, to high school, to undergraduate and graduate programs.
 The Sri Lanka International Center, opened in 2010, is hosted by the American College of Higher Education (ACHE) in Colombo, Sri Lanka.
 The Vietnam International Center, opened in 2011, is hosted by the Vietnamese-American Vocational Training College (VATC) in Ho Chi Minh City, Vietnam.  
Broward College also offers Study Abroad programs in Spain, Germany, Italy, England, India, and Vietnam, allowing students to complete coursework for college credit at institutions throughout the world.

Organization and administration 
The college is part of the Florida College System. Its president is Gregory Adam Haile.  the endowment was $75.7 million.

Academics
The college has close to 5,000 part-time and full-time faculty and staff and serves over 63,000 students annually.

Enrollment

Broward College Libraries
On Broward College's A Hugh Adams’ Central Campus is a four-story University/College library (U/CL) that serves as a joint-use facility for students, faculty, and staff of Florida Atlantic University (FAU) and Broward College (BC). The facility includes a reference desk, café, open stacks, archives/special collections, study rooms, learning resource labs (Academic Success Center), interlibrary loan, and a check-out desk.

Athletics
Broward College participated in collegiate sports programs from 1962 through 2021, when for budgetary reasons all programs were ended.

Also known as the Seahawks, the school had 6 varsity sports: Men's   and Women's Basketball, Men's   and Women's Soccer   Baseball, Softball, Women's Tennis   and Women's Volleyball. All sports competed in the NJCAA and Region 8.

Student life

Notable alumni

References

 
1959 establishments in Florida
Buildings and structures in Fort Lauderdale, Florida
Education in Fort Lauderdale, Florida
Educational institutions established in 1959
Florida College System
Universities and colleges accredited by the Southern Association of Colleges and Schools
Universities and colleges in Broward County, Florida
Coconut Creek, Florida
Universities and colleges in Miami metropolitan area
NJCAA athletics